Lake Latonka is a census-designated place in Coolspring and Jackson Townships in Mercer County, Pennsylvania, United States.  It surrounds the Lake Latonka reservoir. The population was 951 at the 2020 census. It is part of the Youngstown–Warren metropolitan area.

Demographics

References

Census-designated places in Mercer County, Pennsylvania
Census-designated places in Pennsylvania